The 1988–89 Northern Football League season was the 91st in the history of Northern Football League, a football competition in England.

Division One

Division One featured 16 clubs which competed in the division last season, along with four new clubs, promoted from Division Two:
 Billingham Town
 Durham City
 Seaham Red Star
 Stockton

League table

Division Two

Division Two featured 14 clubs which competed in the division last season, along with six new clubs.
 Clubs relegated from Division One:
 Consett
 Ryhope Community
 Clubs joined from the Wearside Football League:
 Murton
 Washington
 Whickham
 Plus:
 Prudhoe East End, joined from the Northern Football Alliance

League table

References

External links
 Northern Football League official site

Northern Football League seasons
1988–89 in English football leagues